Joanne Feinberg Goldstein is an American labor attorney and former Massachusetts Secretary of Labor and Workforce Development.

A graduate of the University of Michigan and the Hofsta University Law School, Goldstein began her legal career practicing union side labor law with Angoff, Goldman, Manning, Pyle and Wanger in Boston. She was the first woman to practice union-side labor law in Massachusetts. She opened her own practice in 1982 and in 1996 she was named General Counsel for the Utility Workers Union of America. In 2007, she was appointed by Massachusetts Attorney General Martha Coakley as Chief of the Attorney General's Fair Labor Division. In January 2010, she was appointed  by Governor Deval Patrick to succeed Suzanne M. Bump as Secretary of Labor and Workforce Development. She was replaced by Patrick on January 17, 2014.

References

State cabinet secretaries of Massachusetts
Massachusetts lawyers
Politicians from Worcester, Massachusetts
University of Michigan alumni
Maurice A. Deane School of Law alumni
20th-century American Jews
Women in Massachusetts politics
20th-century American lawyers
21st-century American lawyers
21st-century American politicians
21st-century American women politicians
Living people
Year of birth uncertain
1950s births
20th-century American women lawyers
21st-century American women lawyers
21st-century American Jews